The Santa Monica Daily Press is a freely distributed microdaily newspaper in Santa Monica which was founded in 2001 by Dave Danforth, Carolyn Sackariason, and Ross Furukawa. The Santa Monica Daily Press is the only local daily newspaper in circulation in Santa Monica, California. The Daily Press has a circulation of 28,000 and a readership of 43,600.

The newspaper's publishers are Ross Furukawa and Todd James.

News Products
The Santa Monica Daily Press (SMDP) is the newspaper of record for the city of Santa Monica, California. Founded in 2001, the Santa Monica Daily Press publishes a print edition six days per week (Monday-Saturday).

The Santa Monica Daily Press also has a podcast, Inside the Daily Press, which publishes one to three new episodes weekly. In-house podcasts "The Dive" and "Reporter's Notebook" are recorded at the studio inside the Daily Press office. Evan Meyer also hosts "Meyerside Chats" interviews, distributed through Inside the Daily Press. 

Each year, Santa Monica Daily Press partners with the City of Santa Monica and local business organizations for the Santa Monica Most Loved contest.

Staff
Its editorial staff consists of editor in chief Matthew Hall and staff writer and Grace Inez Adams. 

Daniel Archuleta was the managing editor for seven years before passing away in 2014.

History
The three founding partners — Carolyn Sackariason, Ross Furukawa and Dave Danforth — worked in the business of free micro dailies in Colorado and were attracted to Santa Monica by the similarities it held to Aspen and the news that the city’s only daily, The Evening Outlook, had recently folded.  In February 2018, Todd James joined the paper as a partner. 

Carolyn Sackariason was the first person to hold the title of Editor in Chief at the Daily Press, but behind the scenes she was performing many other roles: reporter, researcher, scheduler, community outreach leader, copy-editor and even delivery person. Sackariason was the first reporter on scene after the 2003 Farmers Market massacre, when 86-year-old George Russell Weller plowed his car through the market, slaying ten people including a 3-year-old girl and 7-month-old boy.  When Sackariason moved back to Colorado, Michael Tittinger took over as Editor in Chief. 

Tittinger converted the Saturday paper into a magazine-esque edition anchored by a deep dive article that is unconstrained by the quick turn-and-burn nature of the weekday stories. Current editor Matt Hall revived this tradition in summer 2021 and it continues to be an important outlet for investigative and feature reporting. Tittinger also launched a quotes of the week section gathering witty or salient remarks from local figures, which predated the now viral “overheard at” social media accounts and made the community feel more involved with the paper

Editors
Carolyn Sackariason, 2001-2006

Michael Tittinger, 2006-2007

Kevin Herrera, 2008-2014

Matt Hall, 2014-present

References

External links
Santa Monica Daily Press Official Website
Santa Monica Daily Press "e"dition PDF Archives
Santa Monica Daily Press on Twitter
Santa Monica Daily Press on YouTube

Daily newspapers published in Greater Los Angeles
Santa Monica, California
Mass media in Los Angeles County, California